The Jamaica women's national under-20 football team, nicknamed the "Reggae Girlz", is a female football team at the age of U-20 which represent Jamaica in the international women's football. The team plays CONCACAF Women's U-20 Championship. The nation yet to qualified to the FIFA U-20 Women's World Cup.

Team image

Nicknames
The Jamaica women's national under-20 football team has been known or nicknamed as "Reggae Girlz".

Home stadium
The team play its home matches on the Frome Sports Club and others stadiums.

History
The Jamaica women's national under-20 football team of Jamaica at age of U-20. The team have played their first game against Grenada which won by 21–0 goals at Kingston Jamaica on 18 December 2002. The team have participated all the edition of CONCACAF Women's U-20 Championship and their best performance was fourth-place on 2006. The nation has not qualified  to the FIFA U-20 Women's World Cup.

Current squad
The following squad were named recently finished 2022 CONCACAF Women's U-20 Championship

Fixtures and results
Legend

2020

2022

Competitive records
 Champions   Runners-up   Third place   Fourth place

FIFA U-20 Women's World Cup

CONCACAF Women's U-20 Championship

References

South American women's national association football teams
Caribbean women's national association football teams